The Bantac River is a river in the municipality of Magpet in Cotabato province of the Philippines. It is a tributary of the Kabacan River in Kabacan that connects with the Pulangi River in the municipality of Carmen, which empties into the Rio Grande de Mindanao.

Landforms of Cotabato
Rivers of the Philippines